The Allies bombed Nordhausen during World War II in a series of strategic attacks against targets in the Nordhausen district and city.

Targets around Nordhausen included Gustloff factory, Mittelwerk and Nordhausen airfield

Raids and related activities

Notes

References
1944:
January,
February,
March,
April,
May,
June,
July,
August,
September,
October,
November,
December1945:
January,
February,
March,
April,
May,
June,
July,
August,
September

External links
English Article on NordhausenWiki, German
August 1944 461st Bombardment Group (H) August 1944 Bombing missions
Operation Bellicose map

History of Nordhausen
Nordhausen